Nemoria elfa, the cypress emerald moth, is a species of emerald in the family Geometridae. It is found in North America.

The MONA or Hodges number for Nemoria elfa is 7029.

References

Further reading

 
 

Geometrinae